Tennis is part of the Asian Games program.  It has been played at each edition of the games since 1958, with the exception of 1970.  Men's and women's singles, men's and women's doubles, and mixed doubles have been contested each time.  Men's and women's team events have been contested since 1962.

Editions

Events

Medal table

Finals

Men's singles

Women's singles

Men's doubles

Women's doubles

Mixed doubles

List of medalists

References

Medallists from previous Asian Games - Tennis
Sports123 medalists lists

 
Sports at the Asian Games
Asian Games
Asian Games